Jean-Charles François (4 May 1717 – 22 March 1769) was a French engraver.

François was born at Nancy. He was among the pioneers of the so-called "" ("crayon manner") of printmaking, which simulated the appearance of crayon and chalk drawings. He was pensioned by King Louis XV of France, who employed him extensively. His most noted works represent Louis XV, Marie Leszczyńska, Pierre Bayle, Erasmus, John Locke, and Nicolas Malebranche.

He died in 1769 in Paris, aged 51.

References

External links
 

1717 births
1769 deaths
Artists from Nancy, France
18th-century engravers
French engravers